A Mott transition is a metal-nonmetal transition in condensed matter. Due to electric field screening the potential energy becomes much more sharply (exponentially) peaked around the equilibrium position of the atom and electrons become localized and can no longer conduct a current.

Conceptual explanation
In a semiconductor at low temperatures, each 'site' (atom or group of atoms) contains a certain number of electrons and is electrically neutral. For an electron to move away from a site, it requires a certain amount of energy, as the electron is normally pulled back toward the (now positively charged) site by Coulomb forces. If the temperature is high enough that  of energy is available per site, the Boltzmann distribution predicts that a significant fraction of electrons will have enough energy to escape their site, leaving an electron hole behind and becoming conduction electrons that conduct current. The result is that at low temperatures a material is insulating, and at high temperatures the material conducts.

While the conduction in an n- (p-) type doped semiconductor sets in at high temperatures because the conduction (valence) band is partially filled with electrons (holes) with the original band structure being unchanged, the situation is different in the case of the Mott transition where the band structure itself changes. Mott argued that the transition must be sudden, occurring when the density of free electrons N and the Bohr radius  satisfies .

Simply put, a Mott Transition is a change in a material's behavior from insulating to metallic due to various factors. This transition is known to exist in various systems: mercury metal vapor-liquid, metal NH3 solutions, transition metal chalcogenides and transition metal oxides. In the case of transition metal oxides, the material typically switches from being a good electrical insulator to a good electrical conductor. The insulator-metal transition can also be modified by changes in temperature, pressure or composition (doping). As observed by Mott in his 1949 publication on Ni-oxide, the origin of this behavior is correlations between electrons and the close relationship this phenomenon has to magnetism.

The physical origin of the Mott transition is the interplay between the Coulomb repulsion of electrons and their degree of localization (band width). Once the carrier density becomes too high (e.g. due to doping), the energy of the system can be lowered by the localization of the formerly conducting electrons (band width reduction), leading to the formation of a band gap, e.g. by pressure (i.e. a semiconductor/insulator).

In a semiconductor, the doping level also affects the Mott transition. It has been observed that higher dopant concentrations in a semiconductor creates internal stresses that increase the free energy (acting as a change in pressure) of the system, thus reducing the ionization energy.

The reduced barrier causes easier transfer by tunneling or by thermal emission from donor to its adjacent donor. The effect is enhanced when pressure is applied for the reason stated previously. When the transport of carriers overcomes a minute activation energy, the semiconductor has undergone a Mott transition and become metallic.

Other examples of metal–insulator transition include:
 Peierls transition / Charge density wave. Changes in the material symmetry leads to the formation of a band gap at Brillouin zone boundaries.
 Excitonic insulators exhibit very high exciton binding energies driving the transition to the gapped state.
 A Mott–Hubbard transition. V2O3 undergoes a transition from antiferromagnetic insulator to disordered magnetic conducting state.
 A band crossing transition. EuO orders ferromagnetically from a paramagnetic semiconducting state on cooling below its Curie temperature. Below Tc, europium’s valence electrons have enough energy to cross the trap levels due to vacancies on the oxygen sites. This transfer of electrons transforms EuO into the metallic state.
 The Mott transition in doped semiconductors, e.g., Si:P, Si:As, Si:B, Si:Ga, etc. Such transitions have been investigated and demonstrated using electronic Raman scattering.

History
The theory was first proposed by Nevill Francis Mott in a 1949 paper. Mott also wrote a review of the subject (with a good overview) in 1968. The subject has been thoroughly reviewed in a comprehensive paper by Imada, Fujimori and Tokura. A recent proposal of a "Griffiths-like phase close to the Mott transition" has been reported in the literature.

See also 
 Metal–insulator transition

References 

Electric current
Phase transitions